Glasgow Central Mosque is located on the south bank of the River Clyde in the Gorbals district of central Glasgow. The organisation Muslims in Britain classify the Glasgow Central Mosque as Deobandi.

The Mosque

The mosque was designed by W. M. Copeland & Associates in the Islamic style built in Old Red Sandstone, and was completed in 1983.

The Islamic Centre is now the central institution for the local Muslim community, and is the largest community centre in Strathclyde. The mosque itself is Scotland's largest mosque.

Controversies
In February 2016, Habib ur Rehman Rauf, religious head of the mosque, was quoted in the media supporting the actions of Mumtaz Qadri, who assassinated Pakistani politician Salman Taseer whilst acting as his security guard. Imam Habib claimed his messages were taken out of context.

Qadri disagreed with Taseer's opposition to Pakistan's blasphemy law.

In April 2016, the International Business Times revealed that the mosque held annual Khatme Nabuwwat conferences. The mosque president, Dr Mohammed Shafi Kausar refuted the existence of any secular group at the mosque.

Also in April 2016, representatives of Glasgow Central Mosque rejected an invitation to a vigil in memory of Asad Shah, a Pakistani shopkeeper assassinated by a Pakistani Muslim extremist.

Imams
There are currently two Imams at Glasgow Central Mosque:

Shaykh Abdul Ghafoor Ahmad
Qari Wali Ahmed

See also
Islam in the United Kingdom
Islamic schools and branches
Islamism
List of mosques
List of mosques in the United Kingdom

References

External links

Glasgow Central Mosque Official site
Glasgow Central Mosque

1983 establishments in Scotland
Mosques completed in 1983
Mosque buildings with domes
Mosques in Glasgow
Sunni Islam in the United Kingdom
Mosque-related controversies in Europe
Gorbals
Deobandi mosques